Hilton Kidd (1922–2011) was an Australian rugby league player who played in the 1940s and 1950s.

Kidd played four seasons at Balmain between 1945–1948 as a prop-forward. He also played one season with Manly-Warringah in 1951. Kidd won a premiership with Balmain in 1946.

Kidd died on 16 December 2011.

References

1922 births
2011 deaths
Australian rugby league players
Balmain Tigers players
Manly Warringah Sea Eagles players
Rugby league players from Sydney
Rugby league props
Rugby league second-rows